A Dear John letter is a letter written to a man by his wife or romantic partner to inform him that their relationship is over, usually because his partner has found another lover. The man is often a member of the military stationed overseas, although the letter may be used in other ways, including being left for him to discover when he returns from work to an emptied house.

Origin and etymology
While the exact origins of the phrase are unknown, it is commonly believed to have been coined by Americans during World War II. "John" was the most popular and common baby name for boys in America every single year from 1880 through 1923, making it a reasonable placeholder name when denoting those of age for military service. Large numbers of American troops were stationed overseas for many months or years, and as time passed many of their wives or girlfriends decided to begin relationships with new men, rather than to wait for the soldiers to return.

As letters to servicemen from wives or girlfriends back home would typically contain affectionate language (such as "Dear Johnny", "My dearest John", or simply "Darling"), a serviceman receiving a note beginning with a curt "Dear John" when accustomed to a warmer greeting would instantly be aware of the letter's purpose.

A mid-war reference to Dear John letters was made in a United Press article of March 21, 1944.

A writer in the Democrat and Chronicle of Rochester, New York, summed it up in August 1945:

It has been claimed that the Vietnam War inspired more Dear John letters than any other U.S. conflict.  Later, this type of letter formed the background to the British television show Dear John, and the American sitcom based on it debuting two years later also named Dear John.

See also 
 Love letter
 Blue Gardenia, a 1951 film noir driven by a Dear John letter

References 

Relationship breakup
Letters (message)
Love
Military mail